Scissurella sudanica is a species of minute sea snail, a marine gastropod mollusk in the family Scissurellidae.

Description

Distribution

References

Scissurellidae
Gastropods described in 1998